Valentina Ivanina Toro Meneses (born 17 February 2000) is a Chilean karateka. She won the gold medal in the women's 55kg event at the 2022 South American Games held in Asunción, Paraguay. She also won the gold medal in her event at the 2022 Bolivarian Games held in Valledupar, Colombia.

In June 2021, she competed at the World Olympic Qualification Tournament held in Paris, France hoping to qualify for the 2020 Summer Olympics in Tokyo, Japan. In November 2021, she competed in the women's 55kg event at the 2021 World Karate Championships held in Dubai, United Arab Emirates.

She was also one of the flag bearers for Chile during the opening ceremony of the 2022 South American Games.

She studies civil engineering at the University of Santiago, Chile.

Achievements

References 

Living people
2000 births
Place of birth missing (living people)
Chilean female karateka
South American Games gold medalists for Chile
South American Games medalists in karate
Competitors at the 2022 South American Games
21st-century Chilean women